Baličevac is a settlement in Serbia located in the municipality of Merošina, Nišava District. In the 2011 census, there were 1,144 inhabitants.

References

Populated places in Nišava District